Zythos clypeata is a moth of the family Geometridae first described by Katsumi Yazaki in 1996. It is found on the island of Leyte in the Philippines.

The wingspan is 33–34 mm.

References

Moths described in 1996
Scopulini